The following lists events that happened during 1980 in Syria.

Incumbents
President: Hafez al-Assad
Prime Minister: Muhammad Ali al-Halabi (until 9 January), Abdul Rauf al-Kasm (starting 9 January)

Events

April
 April 15 - Syria recognizes the Sahrawi Arab Democratic Republic.

June
 June 25 - A Muslim Brotherhood assassination attempt against President Hafez al-Assad fails. Assad retaliates by sending the army against them.

References

 
1980s in Syria
Years of the 20th century in Syria
Syria
Syria